Highbrook is a suburb located in the city of Auckland, in the North Island of New Zealand. The area is on the eastern side of the Auckland city centre and is a large industrial area developed only in recent years. The area is under governance of the Auckland Council, and is home to a large bulk of New Zealand and international businesses and organisations.

History 
From the 1960s, Highbrook was the estate of Sir Woolf Fisher, founder of Fisher & Paykel. The area was known as the Ra Ora Stud and was used as a breeding and training facility for racehorses.

The Fisher family opted to use the land for commercial development and developed plans in 1998. In 2001, business zoning was allowed and commercial property was developed under the company name Highbrook Development Ltd.

In 2007, the new Highbrook motorway interchange was completed, facilitating improved access to the area.

References

Suburbs of Auckland
Populated places on the Tāmaki River